The Art Farmer Septet is an album by trumpeter Art Farmer, featuring performances recorded in 1953 and 1954, arranged by Quincy Jones and Gigi Gryce, and released by Prestige Records in 1956. It is his earliest recorded full-length album, but was his third issued. The cover art was by cartoonist Don Martin.

The recordings made on July 2, 1953 are possibly the earliest studio recordings of the electric bass, according to musician Chuck Rainey. The four tracks with electric bass, played by Monk Montgomery, display his facility with walking bass lines, bebop melodies, and Latin-style ostinato  (Chuck Rainey said that Monk was the first to record the electric bass). Arranger Quincy Jones highlights Montgomery in the opening sections of three of the four tracks.

All of the players on the 1953 recording were at that time members of the Lionel Hampton Orchestra, and subsequently toured europe with Hampton from September to December 1953, except Sonny Johnson. Johnson was a previous associate of bass player Monk Montgomery, from Indiana.

The four tracks recorded in 1953 were first issued in 1954 on a 10-inch album Work of Art, on Prestige Records. Three singles were released, the first being “Mau Mau (Pt. 1 & 2)” (Prestige 875) in 1953.

Reception

AllMusic called the album "An excellent early hard bop set". The Penguin Guide to Jazz commented that the album demonstrates that Farmer's "style was already firmly in place: a pensive restraint on ballads, a fleet yet soberly controlled attack on uptempo tunes, and a concern for tonal manipulation within a small range of inflexions".

Track listing
All compositions by Art Farmer and Quincy Jones except where noted.
 "Mau Mau" – 5:15   
 "Work of Art" – 5:46   
 "The Little Bandmaster" – 4:06   
 "Up in Quincy's Room" (Gigi Gryce) – 4:00   
 "Wildwood" (Gryce) – 2:55   
 "Evening in Paris" (Quincy Jones) – 2:41   
 "Elephant Walk" (Jones) – 3:25   
 "Tia Juana" (Gryce) – 4:52

Note
Recorded in WOR Studios, New York City on July 2, 1953 (tracks 1–4) and at Van Gelder Studio in Hackensack, New Jersey on June 7, 1954 (tracks 5–8)

Personnel
Art Farmer – trumpet
Jimmy Cleveland – trombone
Clifford Solomon (tracks 1–4), Charlie Rouse (tracks 5–8) – tenor saxophone
Oscar Estell (tracks 1–4), Danny Bank (tracks 5–8) – baritone saxophone
Quincy Jones (tracks 1–4), Horace Silver (tracks 5–8) – piano
Monk Montgomery – electric bass (tracks 1–4)
Percy Heath – bass (tracks 5–8)
Sonny Johnson (tracks 1–4), Art Taylor (tracks 5–8) – drums
Quincy Jones – percussion (track 1)
Quincy Jones (tracks 1–4), Gigi Gryce (tracks 5–8) – arrangement

Production
Doug Hawkins – recording engineer (tracks 1-4)
Ira Gitler – producer (tracks 1-4)
Rudy Van Gelder – recording engineer (tracks 5-8)
Bob Weinstock – producer (tracks 5-8)

References

Prestige Records albums
Art Farmer albums
1956 albums
Albums recorded at Van Gelder Studio
Albums produced by Bob Weinstock
Albums arranged by Quincy Jones
Septets